Phaeodothis is a genus of fungi in the family Didymosphaeriaceae.

References

External links
Index Fungorum

Pleosporales